Sviatoslav Zabelin (born September 23, 1950) is a Russian environmentalist. He is founder of the environmentalist network Socio-Ecological Union. He was awarded the Goldman Environmental Prize in 1993.

References

Russian environmentalists
Russian biologists
Living people
1950 births
Goldman Environmental Prize awardees